Tilmanstone Colliery Halt was a station on the East Kent Light Railway. It opened on 16 October 1916 and was renamed Elvington in 1925. It closed to passenger traffic after the last train on 30 October 1948. The station served the pit village of Elvington. Part of the platform is still in situ hidden in undergrowth.

References

Sources
 

Disused railway stations in Kent
Former East Kent Light Railway stations
Railway stations in Great Britain opened in 1916
Railway stations in Great Britain closed in 1948